The 1842 Illinois gubernatorial election was the seventh quadrennial election for this office.  Democrat Thomas Ford defeated former Whig governor Joseph Duncan.

Results

References
Illinois Blue Book 1899

Illinois
1842
Gubernatorial
August 1842 events